Dyme, or Dymae, was a town and polis (city-state) of ancient Achaea, and the most westerly of the 12 Achaean cities, from which circumstance it is said to have derived its name. The location of Dyme is near the modern Kato Achaia.

Location
It was situated near the coast, according to Strabo 60 stadia from the promontory Araxus, and according to Pausanias 30 stadia from the river Larisus, which separated its territory from Elis.

Names
It is further said by Strabo to have been formed out of a union of 8 villages, one of which was called Teuthea (Τευθέα); and it is probable, that some of the different names, by which the city is said to have been called, were originally the names of the separate villages. Thus, its more ancient name is stated by Pausanias to have been Paleia (Πάλεια), and by Strabo to have been Stratus or Stratos (Στρατός). The poet Antimachus gave it the epithet Cauconis, which was derived by some from the iron Caucon in the neighbourhood, and by others from the Caucones, who were supposed to have originally inhabited this district.

History

Greek history
The first resident of note was Oebotas who was said to be the first Achaean to win at the Ancient Olympic Games. He was not honored for his victory by the Achaeans and legendarily cursed the Achaeans to never win the Olympics for that and the Achaeans did not have an Olympic winner until Sostratus of Pellene won the race.
Thucydides indicates it was near a great naval battle of the Peloponnesian War and that some fleeing the battle found shelter there. After the death of Alexander the Great, Dyme fell into the hands of Cassander, but his troops were driven out of the city by Aristodemus, the general of Antigonus, 314 BCE. This city had the honour, along with Patrae, of reviving the Achaean League in 280 BCE; and about this time or shortly afterwards its population received an accession from some of the inhabitants of Olenus, who abandoned their town. In the Social War (220-217 BCE), the territory of Dyme, from its proximity to Elis, was frequently laid waste by the Eleans.

Roman era
In the First Macedonian War Cycliadas and Philip V of Macedon would prepare for an attack on Elis near Dyme; but in consequence of Dyme being the only one of the Achaean cities which espoused the cause of the Macedonian king, it was plundered by the Romans under Publius Sulpicius Galba Maximus. From this blow it never recovered; and it is said to have been without inhabitants when Pompey settled here a large number of Cilician pirates. In the civil wars that followed, some of these new inhabitants were expelled from their lands and resumed their old occupations. Both Strabo and Pliny the Elder call Dyme a Roman colony; but this statement appears to be a mistake, since it is known that Dyme was one of the towns placed under the authority of Patrae, when it was made a Roman colony by Augustus; and it is expressly told that no other Achaean town except Patrae was allowed the privilege of self-government.

See also
Dymaean Wall
List of ancient Greek cities

References

External links
A description from Greek Travel Pages

Cities in ancient Peloponnese
Former populated places in Greece
Populated places in ancient Achaea
Achaean city-states
Greek city-states